Catherine Cooke is an English former cricketer who played as a bowler. She appeared in six One Day Internationals for England between 1989 and 1990, making her debut against The Netherlands. Overall, she took two wickets, scored 10 runs and took three catches. She played domestic cricket for Yorkshire.

References

External links
 
 

Year of birth missing (living people)
Place of birth missing (living people)
Living people
England women One Day International cricketers
Yorkshire women cricketers